Kit Sebastian Connor (born 8 March 2004) is an English actor. He has appeared in the films Get Santa (2014), Rocketman (2019) and Little Joe (2019). On television, he had a recurring role in the CBBC series Rocket's Island (2014–2015) and a voice role in the BBC One and HBO series His Dark Materials. He gained recognition for his starring role as Nick Nelson in the Netflix teen series Heartstopper (2022), for which he won the Children's and Family Emmy Award for Outstanding Lead Performance in 2022.

Early life and education
Kit Sebastian Connor was born in the South London Borough of Croydon on 8 March 2004. A local of Purley, he attended the Hayes Primary School in Kenley and then Whitgift School in South Croydon, where he completed his A Levels in drama, English literature and history.

Career
Connor made his onscreen debut at the age of eight with minor appearances in Chickens on Sky One, the television film An Adventure in Space and Time, and the soap opera Casualty. In 2014, he starred as Tom Anderson in the holiday comedy Get Santa, and as a recurring character Archie Beckles in the CBBC series Rocket's Island.

Connor recurred as young Petya Rostov in the miniseries War & Peace and as Bob Sheehan in the miniseries SS-GB. He made his stage debut in Welcome Home, Captain Fox! at Donmar Warehouse.

Connor had roles in the 2018 films The Mercy, The Guernsey Literary and Potato Peel Pie Society, Slaughterhouse Rulez, as well as the BBC One television film Grandpa's Great Escape. He starred as Alexander in the Old Vic Theatre production of Fanny & Alexander.

In 2019, Connor portrayed a teenaged Elton John in the musical film Rocketman, and played Joe Woodard in the drama Little Joe. That same year, he began voicing Pantalaimon in the BBC One and HBO fantasy series His Dark Materials.

In April 2021, it was announced that Connor would star opposite Joe Locke in the Netflix series Heartstopper, an adaptation of the webcomic and graphic novel of the same name by Alice Oseman. He originally auditioned for the role of Charlie, but ended up cast as the other lead, Nick Nelson.

Connor is set to star in an upcoming film adaptation of the novel A Cuban Girl's Guide to Tea and Tomorrow by Laura Taylor Namey.

Personal life
In October 2022, Connor came out as bisexual in a Twitter post. Connor, who had objected to speculation on his sexuality in the past, had quit Twitter the previous month due to harassment and claims of queerbaiting after he was photographed holding hands with actress Maia Reficco. In his coming out tweet, Connor criticised fans for "forcing an 18 year old to out himself" and having "missed the point of [Heartstopper]". A number of fans expressed support for Connor and condemned his treatment, as did Heartstopper creator Alice Oseman, co-stars Joe Locke, Sebastian Croft, Kizzy Edgell and Olivia Colman, journalist Mark Harris, and Labour Party MP Nadia Whittome.

Filmography

Film

Television

Theatre

Video games

Accolades

References

External links

 
 

2004 births
21st-century English male actors
21st-century English LGBT people
Bisexual male actors
Emmy Award winners
English male child actors
English male film actors
English male stage actors
English male television actors
English male voice actors
English LGBT actors
Living people
Male actors from London
Male actors from Surrey
People educated at Whitgift School
People from Purley, London
People from the London Borough of Croydon